Alfonso Moreno Morán (born 21 January 1950) is a Mexican politician affiliated with the National Action Party. As of 2014 he served as Deputy of the LIX Legislature of the Mexican Congress representing Guanajuato.

References

1950 births
Living people
Politicians from Guanajuato
People from León, Guanajuato
National Action Party (Mexico) politicians
Autonomous University of San Luis Potosi alumni
Members of the Congress of Guanajuato
21st-century Mexican politicians
Deputies of the LIX Legislature of Mexico
Members of the Chamber of Deputies (Mexico) for Guanajuato